Schellenberg is a municipality in the lowland area of Liechtenstein, on the banks of the Rhine. , it has a population of 1,107 and covers an area of

History

Early history

The area was first settled by Celts, then by Rhaetians. Rome conquered the area in 15 BC, and made it part of the province of Rhaetia. The Province later became a county (countship) under Charlemagne. The county was repeatedly divided among heirs.

The Lordship of Schellenberg was purchased by the Counts of Vaduz in 1437 and the two states have been united in fact ever since. After the Swabian War in 1499, both came under Austrian suzerainty. Different dynasties of counts bought and sold them, until their purchase in the early 18th century by the Liechtenstein dynasty, which had been granted princely status in 1706, but which needed to acquire a territory with imperial immediacy in order to vote in the Diet of the Princes of the Empire. The emperor formally united Vaduz and Schellenberg in 1719 as the Principality of Liechtenstein.

World War II
The Russian Monument in the municipality commemorates the asylum given to Russian soldiers during the Second World War. Near the end of World War II, Liechtenstein granted asylum to approximately five hundred soldiers of the First Russian National Army, a collaborationist Russian force within the German Wehrmacht. This act was no small matter, as the country was poor and had difficulty feeding and caring for such a large group of refugees. Eventually, Argentina agreed to resettle the asylum seekers permanently. In contrast, the British repatriated the Russians who fought on the German side to the USSR.

Geography
Schellenberg territory borders with the Liechtensteiner municipalities of Eschen, Gamprin, Mauren and Ruggell. It borders also with the Austrian municipality of Feldkirch, in the federal state of Vorarlberg.

Transport
In Schellenberg there is a small road crossing to Austria, manned by Austrian and Swiss border guards.

Notable people
 Fabienne Wohlwend, motor racing driver.

References

External links 

 
  
   

Municipalities of Liechtenstein
Austria–Liechtenstein border crossings